USS Aylwin (Destroyer No. 47/DD-47) was the lead ship of s built for the United States Navy prior to the American entry into World War I. The ship was the second U.S. Navy vessel named in honor of John Cushing Aylwin, a U.S. Navy officer killed in action aboard  during the War of 1812.

Aylwin was laid down by She was sponsored by Mrs. Joseph Wright Powell. She was armed with four  guns and had eight 18-inch (450 mm) torpedo tubes. Aylwin was powered by a pair of steam turbines that propelled her at up to 

On 6 April, two sailors on board Aylwin died when she suffered an explosion in her No. 1 fire room. Out of commission while repairs were made, Aylwin was recommissioned in May 1915 and joined the Atlantic Fleet.

After the United States entered World War I in April 1917, Aylwin conducted experiments with Reginald Fessenden until January 1918. She was then sent overseas to conduct anti-submarine patrols from Queenstown, Ireland, and Plymouth. In December, she accompanied light cruiser  on an inspection tour of German Baltic ports. Upon returning to the United States at the end of June 1919, Aylwin was placed in reserve. She was decommissioned at Philadelphia in February 1921. In July 1933 she dropped her name, becoming known only as DD-47. She was struck from the Naval Vessel Register in March 1935 and ordered scrapped in April.

Design and construction
Aylwin was authorized in March 1911 as the lead ship of the four-ship , which was almost identical to the s authorized at the same time. Construction of the vessel—like her three sister ships—was awarded to William Cramp & Sons of Philadelphia which laid down her keel on 7 May 1912. On 23 November, Aylwin was launched by sponsor Mrs. Joseph Wright Powell, wife of the assistant to the president of the Cramp shipyard. The ship was the second U.S. Navy ship named for John Cushing Aylwin, a U.S. Navy officer killed in action aboard  during the War of 1812.

Aylwin had two steam turbines that drove her two screw propellers, and an additional pair triple-expansion steam engines, each connected to one of the propeller shafts, for cruising purposes. However, during builder's trials conducted in July 1913, Aylwin failed to reach this speed, and was withdrawn from testing. After sister ship Parker exceeded the design speed in August with a different propeller design, The Washington Post reported that Aylwins propellers would be changed to the new design.

Aylwin was also equipped with four twin  torpedo tubes.

Pre-World War I
Aylwin was commissioned into the U.S. Navy on 17 January 1914, under the command of Lieutenant Commander Leigh C. Palmer, the former naval aide of U.S. Secretary of the Navy Josephus Daniels. Following a short cruise to Cuba, Aylwin conducted operations off the North Carolina coast in April. An explosion ripped through the forward fire room on Aylwin, injuring three men. Benham loaded the three wounded sailors and sped to the naval hospital at Norfolk, Virginia, while Parker took on the remainder of Aylwins crew. One of the injured men died on Benham before landfall was made in Virginia; another died a short time later. The crews of all three destroyers raised $250 to help defray funeral expenses for the widow of one of the men.

Aylwin remained afloat but, unmanned, was towed into Norfolk by Parker and U.S. Navy tug , arriving on 7 April. According to a report in The Washington Post, Aylwin made it to port with only five hours of buoyancy to spare. The report described the fore deck of the ship as "badly rent and torn up" and noted that two of the destroyer's four stacks were knocked out of alignment by the blast, with one askew at a 25° angle from its normal position. The newspaper speculated that faulty metal in the No. 1 boiler's mud drum was the cause of the explosion. Although repairs were estimated to take roughly three months, Aylwin was placed out of commission and remained inactive for more than a year at the Norfolk Navy Yard.

She was recommissioned on 25 May 1915 and assigned to the 6th Division, Torpedo Flotilla, Atlantic Fleet. The ship then cruised along the east coast carrying out routine patrols. Prior to the entrance of the United States into World War I, she served on Neutrality Patrols, trying to protect American and neutral-flagged merchant ships from interference by British or German warships and U-boats. In the course of performing those duties, Aylwin was at Newport, Rhode Island in early October 1916. At 05:30 on 8 October, wireless reports came in of a German submarine stopping ships near the Lightship Nantucket, off the eastern end of Long Island. After an SOS from the British steamer  was received at about 12:30, Rear Admiral Albert Gleaves ordered Aylwin and other destroyers at Newport to attend to survivors. The American destroyers arrived on the scene about 17:00 when the U-boat,  under the command of Kapitänleutnant Hans Rose, was in the process of stopping the Holland-America Line cargo ship . Shortly after, U-53 stopped the British passenger ship . As Rose had done with three other ships, U-53 had sunk earlier in the day, he gave passengers and crew aboard Blommersdijk and Stephano adequate time to abandon the ships before sinking the pair. At one point, Rose signaled Aylwin requesting that she move out of the way to allow Stephano to be torpedoed, much to the later chagrin of Lord Beresford, who denounced Aylwins compliance as "aiding and abetting" the Germans in a speech in the House of Lords. In total, 226 survivors from U-53s five victims were rescued by the destroyer flotilla. Aylwin picked up the crew of Stephano and a number of passengers, later transferring them to destroyer  for return to Newport.

During the early months of 1917, Aylwin sailed to Cuban waters for winter maneuvers and returned to the Virginia capes area upon America's entry into World War I.

World War I
From June 1917-January 1918, the destroyer participated in special experimental work with Reginald Fessenden while operating out of Boston, Massachusetts, and Newport, Rhode Island. On 4 January 1918, Aylwin sailed for Queenstown, Ireland; and, shortly after her arrival there, began patrolling out of that port. However, shortly thereafter, she was detached to join British forces operating from Portsmouth and Devonport in conducting antisubmarine patrols.

Aylwin remained in European waters following the end of the war. On 26 December 1918, she sailed in company with light cruiser  for an inspection tour of the Baltic ports of Germany. The ships, which, were operating under the auspices of the Inter-Allied Naval Armistice Commission, were to remove any American prisoners of war or citizens discovered in the German ports.

Postwar
In May 1919, the base of operations for U.S. destroyers in European waters was shifted from Brest, France, to Antwerp, and Aylwin, arriving there on 22 May, was the first ship to relocated to the Belgian port. The following month, Aylwin returned to Brest, and departed from there for the United States, arriving at New York on 26 June. She then proceeded to the Philadelphia Navy Yard where she was placed in reserve.

Aylwin was decommissioned at Philadelphia on 23 February 1921. On 1 July 1933, she dropped the name Aylwin to free it for a new destroyer of the same name, becoming known only as DD-47. The ship was struck from the Naval Vessel Register on 8 March 1935, and on 23 April was ordered scrapped in accordance with the terms of the London Naval Treaty.

Notes

References

Bibliography

External links

 

Aylwin-class destroyers
Ships built by William Cramp & Sons
1912 ships
World War I destroyers of the United States